New Zealand competed at the 2001 World Championships in Athletics held in Edmonton, Canada. They did not have any athletes placed in the top 8 in any event.

Entrants

Key
Q = Qualified for the next round by placing (track events) or automatic qualifying target (field events)
q = Qualified for the next round as a fastest loser (track events) or by position (field events)
AR = Area (Continental) Record
NR = National record
PB = Personal best
SB = Season best
Placing x(y): x = place in group/heat; y = place in final
- = Round not applicable for the event

References

Nations at the 2001 World Championships in Athletics
New Zealand at the World Championships in Athletics
World Championships in Athletics